Dhaalu Atoll (also known as Southern Nilandhe Atoll or) is one of the atolls of the Maldives. It corresponds to the natural atoll of the same name.

Geography
Dhaalu Atoll stretches 23 km (14 mi) from east to west, and 38 km (24 mi) north to south. Out of a total of 56 islands in the atoll, seven of the islands are inhabited, with a total population of around 6694. The capital island is Kudahuvadhoo, located at the atoll's southern tip.

Hulhudheli and Rinbudhoo (Rimbudu) islands, located to the west of the atoll, are islands traditionally renowned for the skill of their jewellers.

The formerly inhabited island of Gemendhoo on the eastern fringe of the atoll is surrounded by a long line of 11 uninhabited islands. The route from Bulhalafushi to Naibukaloabodufushi passes through these islands and can be walked in during low tide.

Dhaalu Atoll Hospital is located in the island of Kudahuvadhoo.

Dhaalu Atoll is accessible through regular domestic flights from Velana International Airport to Dhaalu Airport located on Kudahuvadhoo as well as local ferry services.

History
Some of the islands in this atoll have remains from the Buddhist period, but none of them have been properly excavated yet. Mysterious mounds known as hawittas are found in Kudahuvadhu. The old mosque of Kudahuvadhoo possesses some of the finest masonry in the country.

Opened to tourism in 1998, the atoll has become a popular location for scuba diving.

Gemendhoo was abandoned after the Boxing Day tsunamis destroyed the buildings.

Rinbudhoo was also badly hit by the tsunami and half of the population were migrated to thulusdhoo. It is said Rinbudhoo was one of the islands having the highest density of population back in the early days. but now its just the opposite. The Island has an almost 300 years old masjid built with curved stones.

Tourism
Dhaalu Atoll is home to several luxury tourist resorts including St Regis Vommuli Maldives, Niyama Private Islands Maldives, Kandima Maldives, Angsana Velavaru, Vilu Reef, and Aaaveee. Several other resorts are under development.

References

 Divehi Tārīkhah Au Alikameh. Divehi Bahāi Tārikhah Khidmaiykurā Qaumī Markazu. Reprint 1958 edn. Malé 1990.
 Divehiraajjege Jōgrafīge Vanavaru. Muhammadu Ibrahim Lutfee. G.Sōsanī.
 Xavier Romero-Frias, The Maldive Islanders, A Study of the Popular Culture of an Ancient Ocean Kingdom. Barcelona 1999.

Administrative atolls of the Maldives
Atolls of the Maldives